Formica lemani is an ant species that is similar to Formica fusca. The species was not formally distinguished as being different from Formica fusca until 1917, and was not clearly described until 1954.

This species of ant is found throughout most of Europe, and parts of Asia.

References

lemani
Hymenoptera of Europe
Insects described in 1917